The Marienwerder Region was a government region (Regierungsbezirk) of Prussia from 1815 until 1920 and again 1939-1945. It was a part of the Province of West Prussia from 1815 to 1829, and again 1878–1920, belonging to the Province of Prussia in the intervening years, and to the Reichsgau Danzig-West Prussia in the years 1939-1945. The regional capital was Marienwerder in West Prussia (now Kwidzyn).

History
Most of Polish Royal Prussia was annexed by King Frederick the Great of Prussia in the 1772 First Partition of Poland. The town of Marienwerder, previously in Ducal Prussia, became an administrative capital of the newly acquired territory, which became the Province of West Prussia on 31 January 1773.

West Prussia was divided into the regions of Danzig and Marienwerder in 1815, following the Napoleonic Wars.

From 1815 to 1818, West Prussia was reorganised into districts (or Kreise), within each government region.

Up until 1920, the Marienwerder Region comprised the urban districts (Stadtkreise) of Graudenz (Grudziądz) and Thorn (Toruń), both established on 1 January 1900.

The Marienwerder Region was placed under an inter-Allied commission from 1920 to 1922 and was eventually divided, with the western districts included within the newly established Polish Republic as part of the so-called Polish Corridor. The eastern part of Marienwerder that voted to be incorporated within the Weimar Republic was named the Region of West Prussia while it was joined to the Province of East Prussia from 1922 to 1939, after which the original Marienwerder Region was restored until its dissolution in 1945.

Demographics 
Regierungsbezirk Marienwerder had a majority German population, with a large Polish minority.

Districts 1818 to 1920

Urban districts
Thorn (1900-1920; 1939-1945), disentangled from Thorn District 
Graudenz (1900-1920; 1939-1945), disentangled from Graudenz District

Rural districts
 (1818-1920; 1939-1945), based in Culm upon Vistula 
 (1887-1920; 1939-1945), based in Briesen in West Prussia
 (1772-1945), based in Deutsch-Krone
Flatow (1818-1945), based in Flatow
 (1818-1920), based in Graudenz
 (1772-1920; 1939-1945), based in Konitz
Löbau (1818-1920; 1939-1945), based in Löbau in West Prussia 
Marienwerder (1752-1945), based in Marienwerder in West Prussia
Rosenberg (1818-1945), based in Rosenberg in West Prussia 
Schlochau (1818-1945), based in Schlochau 
 (1818-1920), based in Schwetz
 (1818-1920; 1939-1945), based in Strasburg in West Prussia
Stuhm (1818-1945), based in Stuhm
 (1818-1920; 1939-1945), based in Thorn
 (1875-1920; 1939-1945), based in Tuchel

Regional presidents
Each of the nineteen Regierungsbezirke featured a non-legislative governing body called a Regierungspräsidium or Bezirksregierung (regional government) headed by a Regierungspräsident (regional president), concerned mostly with applying state law to administrative decisions on municipalities within their jurisdiction and their umbrella organisations (the districts).
 1814–1823 : Theodor Gottlieb von Hippel the Younger (1775–1843)
 1823–1825 : Johann Carl Rothe (1771–1853)
 1825–1830 : Eduard von Flottwell (1786–1865)
 1830–1850 :  (1785–1854)
 1850–1875 : Botho Heinrich zu Eulenburg (1804–1879)
 1875–1881 :  (1829–1909)
 1881–1891 :  (1832–1904)
 1891–1901 :  (1833–1911)
 1901–1905 :  (1853–1930)
 1905–1920 :  (1858–1931)
 1939–1945 :

Literature 
  Michael Rademacher: Deutsche Verwaltungsgeschichte Preußen, Provinz Westpreußen  (2006)
   E. Jacobson: Topographisch-statistisches Handbuch für den Regierungsbezirk Marienwerder, Danzig 1868 (Online, Google).

References 

States and territories disestablished in 1945
West Prussia
Government regions of Prussia
States and territories established in 1815
1815 establishments in Prussia
1920 disestablishments in Germany
1939 establishments in Germany
1945 disestablishments in Germany